Dhaka Third Division Football League is the fifth-tier football league in Bangladesh, as well as the third and lowest league division in Dhaka. It was established in 1948 as the third-tier of the Dhaka League, while Bangladesh was still under Pakistani rule. Currently the five top-finishing teams in the Super League round are automatically promoted to the Dhaka Second Division Football League. While the bottom  team in the two groups during the first phase, are relegated to the Bangladesh Pioneer Football League. A total eighteen teams compete in the league.

History

In 1948, a year after the independence of Pakistan and India, the Dhaka Sporting Association officially established a three-tiered football league system, and the Dhaka Third Division Football League was formed as the lowest tier in the system. 

Since 1972, the league has been run by Dhaka Metropolition Football League Committee under supervision of the Bangladesh Football Federation. 

In 1993, the league became the 4th-tier of domestic football, with the Dhaka First Division Football League replacing the Dhaka Second Division Football League as the second-tier, both the Second and Third divisions of Dhaka shifted down a tier. In 2007, with the introduction of the country’s first wide open national football league, Bangladesh Premier League, Dhaka football system changed again, as the Dhaka First Division Football League was merged to the Dhaka Premier Division League (Dhaka League), reintroduced as the 2nd-tier known as the Dhaka Senior Division Football League. However, the Dhaka Third Division League remained as the country’s 4-tier. In 2012, with the intorduction of the second wide open national football league, the Bangladesh Championship League as the new second-tier, all three of Dhaka’s football leagues shifted down a tier and the Third Division turned into the 5th-tier of Bangladeshi football.

On 16 September 2021, the Bangladesh Football Federation decided to postpone the 2021–2022 league season. On 3 January 2023, the Bangladesh Football Federation announced that the 2021–2022 league season would finally began from 7 January 2023, and participating clubs will only be allowed to field U17 players.

Structure

League Summaries

Top goalscorers by season

References

Dhaka Third Division Football League
Fifth level football leagues in Asia
3
Professional sports leagues in Bangladesh
1948 establishments in East Pakistan
Sports leagues established in 1948
Sport in Dhaka